Forgeard is a surname. Notable people with the surname include:

 Kyle Forgeard, Canadian YouTuber 
 Noël Forgeard (born 1946), French industrialist